Darrell Dyer (born ) is an English rugby union player.

He was on the books at Northampton Saints  and played for Ampthill RUFC, Coventry R.F.C., Bedford Blues, and Hartpury University R.F.C. where he featured both as a blindside-flanker and number eight. In 2018 Dyer moved to France and joined US Carcassonne to play in the Rugby Pro D2 league, however on 1 June 2021 it was announced he was leaving Carcassonne to join Valence Romans Drôme Rugby for the 2021-22 season.

References

English rugby union players
1992 births
Living people
Ampthill RUFC players
Coventry R.F.C. players
Hartpury University R.F.C. players
Bedford Blues players